Chimera is a 2001 Italian romance film directed by Pappi Corsicato.

Plot 
One night in bed a husband tells his wife about a couple he knows whose relationship has fallen through. This leads to a series of role-playing games to make sure their relationship does not head down the same path.

Cast 
Iaia Forte as Emma
 Tommaso Ragno as Sal
Tomas Arana as  Tomas
Angelica Ippolito as  Dora
Franco Nero as The Businessman
 Marit Nissen as Desirè

Award and Nominations

References

External links

Rotten Tomatoes 
   
2001 films
Italian romance films
2000s romance films
Films directed by Pappi Corsicato
2000s Italian films